Dendrotriton megarhinus, also known as the longnose bromeliad salamander or  long-nosed bromeliad salamander, is a species of salamander in the family Plethodontidae. It is endemic to southwestern Chiapas, Mexico, where it is only known from the Cerro Tres Picos, the type locality.

Description
The type series consists of eight specimens. The three males that could be reliably sexed measure  in snout–vent length. Similarly, the two females with reliable sex measure  in snout–vent length. The snout is elongate and have extremely large nostrils (to which the specific name megarhinus refers). The body is slender. The digits have relatively broad tips and show a variable degree of webbing. The alcohol-preserved specimens are dorsally dark brown with some darker and light mottling along the middle of the back and tail. The venter is dirty cream.

Habitat and conservation
It lives in terrestrial bromeliads. It was common within its small range in the 1970s, but more recent information is lacking. There are no direct threats to this species but its small range renders it vulnerable to stochastic events. It is protected by law in Mexico and occurs in the La Sepultura Biosphere Reserve.

References

megarhinus
Endemic amphibians of Mexico
Sierra Madre de Chiapas
Amphibians described in 1960
Taxa named by George B. Rabb
Taxonomy articles created by Polbot